Dumfries Road is the name of multiple highways:

Ontario
 Waterloo Regional Road 47, named Dumfries Road

Virginia
 Virginia State Route 234, named Dumfries Road from Prince William Parkway to U.S. Route 1
 Virginia State Route 234 Business, named Dumfries Road from Wellington Road to Prince William Parkway
 Virginia State Route 605 (Fauquier and Prince William Counties), named Dumfries Road in Fauquier County
 Virginia State Route 606, named Dumfries Road in Fauquier County
 Virginia State Route 667, named Old Dumfries Road in Fauquier County